Karlow or Karlów is a surname.  Notable people with this name include the following:

Pierre Karlów (fl. 1945–1956), Polish footballer
Serge Karlow, known as Peter Karlow (1921 – 2005), CIA technical officer

See also

Karlo (name)
Karlos (name)
Karlov (surname)`
Karow (disambiguation)
Kalow (disambiguation)
Karłowo (disambiguation)
Karolów (disambiguation)

Surnames from given names